Ulf Harald Linde (15 April 1929 – 12 October 2013) was a Swedish art critic, writer, museum director and a member of the Swedish Academy.

Born in Stockholm, he was elected to the Swedish Academy on 10 February 1977 and admitted on 20 December 1977. Linde succeeded the writer Eyvind Johnson to Seat No.11. Linde was the director of the Thiel Gallery in Stockholm between 1977 and 1997.

Ulf Linde was active as a jazz musician, mainly in the late 1940s and early 1950s. He played vibraphone and recorded with Arne Domnérus and Putte Wickman among others.

Bibliography
 Ragnar Sandberg: 1944-55 (1955)
 Anteckningar om schweizerstilen (1959)
 Johan Krouthén 1858-1932 (1958)
 Spejare : en essä om konst (1960)
 Lennart Rodhe (1962)
 Marcel Duchamp (1963)
 Siri Derkert (1964)
 Fyra artiklar (1965)
 Contreras : januari 1969 (1969)
 Geometrin i en målning av Piero della Francesca (1974)
 Eyvind Johnson : inträdestal i Svenska akademien (1977)
 Rune Jansson (1980)
 Johan Krouthén : 1858-1932 (1981)
 Claes Eklundh (1981)
 Ulf Gripenholm (1984)
 Harald Lyth : målningar 1980-1985 (1985)
 Efter hand : texter 1950-1985 (1985)
 Marcel Duchamp (1986)
 Kjell Anderson : målningar 1970-86 (1986)
 Bo Trankell (1986)
 Den sentimentale satyren : om Heidenstams Hans Alienus (1987)
 Karl Axel Pehrson (1987)
 Bo Larsson (1987)
 Mot fotografiet (1989)
 Kjell Strandqvist (1989)
 Olle Olsson Hagalund (1989)
 Ingemar Nygren (1990)
 Gripenholm eller Tolv variationer över ett tema av * Basilius Valentinus (1990)
 Olle Skagerfors : akvareller och teckningar (1991)
 Clinch (1993)
 Rune Rydelius (1996)
 John-E Franzén : målningar och teckningar (1996)
 Lars Kleen : Konstruktionen : constructions (1998)
 Svar (1999)
 Ulf Gripenholm : målningar, teckningar, grafik (2002)
 Jazz : kåserier i Orkesterjournalen 1950-1953 och två artiklar (2004)
 Edvard Munch och Thielska galleriet (2007)
 Hans Lannér (2008)
 Från kart till fallfrukt : 70 korta kapitel om mitt liv et cetera (2008)
 Sammelsurium (2011)
 X-ets lustgård (2013)

Discography
 Jazz: 1948-1952

References

1929 births
2013 deaths
Members of the Swedish Academy
Scientists from Stockholm
Jazz vibraphonists